Antony of Siya (1479–1556) was a Russian Orthodox monk who was proclaimed a saint after his death. He founded the Antonievo-Siysky Monastery on the River Siya in modern Arkhangelsk Oblast, Russia.

Antony was born a peasant. He married while a young man and was a normal peasant until after the death of his wife. He then entered the monastery at Kargopol. He did not stay there long and afterward became a wandering monk along the shores of the Arctic Ocean.

In 1520 Antony founded his monastery. He received permission from Vasily III to erect monastic buildings on state land. He also was a vocal advocate of monastic control of peasant villages.

Vasily's grandson Ivan wrote a biography on Antony.

References

External links
Biography of St. Antony on the official site of Antonievo-Siysky Monastery 

1479 births
1556 deaths
16th-century Christian saints
Russian Orthodox monks
Russian saints of the Eastern Orthodox Church